Planiplastron is an extinct genus of snapping turtle. It was first described by Chkhikvadze in 1971. It was assigned to the family Chelydridae by R. L. Carroll in 1988.

References

Extinct reptiles
Chelydridae
Oligocene turtles
Prehistoric turtle genera
Fossil taxa described in 1971
Extinct turtles